Valencia  is a 1927 German silent film directed by Jaap Speyer and starring , Dorothea Wieck, and Oskar Marion. It was made at the Emelka Studios in Munich.

Cast

References

Bibliography

External links

1927 films
Films of the Weimar Republic
German silent feature films
Films directed by Jaap Speyer
Films set in Spain
Bavaria Film films
German black-and-white films
Films shot at Bavaria Studios